The Great Sandy Strait is a strait in the Australian state of Queensland of  length which separates mainland Queensland from Fraser Island. It is also a locality in the Fraser Coast Region local government area.

Geography
The Great Sandy Strait extends south from Hervey Bay to Inskip Point. The Mary River enters the strait at River Heads. Tourism and commercial fishing are the two main industries that are active within the Strait. Boating and fishing are also pursued for recreation. Each year in June the Bay to Bay yacht race is sailed on the Great Sandy Strait.

There are numerous named and unnamed islands in the strait. The named island are from north to south: Big Woody Island, Round Island, Little Woody Island, Picnic Island, Duck Island, Walsh Island, Turkey Island, Bookar Island, Thomas Island, Slain Island, Tooth Island, Round Bush Island, New Island, Garden Island, Dream Island, and Stewart Island. Most of the island are low and sandy in character. Only a few have significant elevations, e.g.

History 
In July and August 1799 Matthew Flinders chartered the coast from Moreton Bay to Hervey Bay in the Norfolk. Although he established that K'gari (Fraser Island) was not a peninsula (as was then believed) but an island, he failed to find a navigable channel through the Great Sandy Strait. His explorations of the area is commemorated by a monument called Matthew Flinders Lookout at the top of an escarpment facing the bay in Dayman Park, Urangan.

Lieutenant Joseph Dayman was the first European to navigate through the Great Sandy Strait on 10 November 1846 in a small decked boat called the Asp. It had been intended that Dayman rendezvous with HMS Rattlesnake but that ship had already departed. Dayman decided it was safer to take the Asp through the Great Sandy Strait rather than risk taking the route to the ocean side of the K'gari (Fraser Island) as he was concerned about rounding the Breaksea Spit.

Environment
A complex landscape of mangroves, sandbanks, intertidal sand, mud islands, salt marshes and seagrass beds, the Strait is an important habitat for breeding fish, crustaceans, dugongs, dolphins and marine turtles. Migrating humpback whales use the calms waters of the strait to rest for a few days between July and November.  An analysis of commercial catch data in the area between 1988 and 2003 revealed a significant reduction in fish stock. The campaign against the Traveston Crossing Dam included claims the dam would have a significant environmental impact on the Great Sandy Strait. It is located within the boundaries of the Great Sandy Marine Park and adjoins other protected areas within or adjacent to the Strait include Great Sandy National Park, Poona National Park and Great Sandy Conservation Park.

Birds

The lower part of Great Sandy Strait was listed under the Ramsar Convention as a wetland of international significance in 1999.  The area is also an important roosting site for CAMBA and JAMBA listed species.  Some 806 km2 of the strait has been identified by BirdLife International as an Important Bird Area because it supports about 120,000 non-breeding waders, including over 1% of the global populations of bar-tailed godwits, eastern curlews, great knots, grey-tailed tattlers, lesser sand plovers, pied oystercatchers, red-necked stints and red-capped plovers, as well as small numbers of the range-restricted mangrove honeyeater.

See also

 Hinchinbrook Channel
 List of Ramsar sites in Australia
 Pumicestone Passage
Great Sandy Biosphere Reserve

References

External links

Great Sandy Strait Ramsar Site
Official Great Sandy Biosphere Reserve website
Whalesong Cruises - Eco friendly medium sized vessel running cruises in the Great Sandy Strait, based in Hervey Bay

Coastline of Queensland
Ramsar sites in Australia
Important Bird Areas of Queensland
Wide Bay–Burnett
Localities in Queensland
Fraser Coast Region